Bob Hewitt and Frew McMillan won the title, defeating Clark Graebner and Lew Hoad 6–3, 6–2 in the final.

Draw

Finals

Top half

Bottom half

External links
 Draw

1972 Grand Prix (tennis)
1972 Bristol Open